Treuenbrietzen is a town in the Bundesland of Brandenburg, Germany.

Geography
The municipality Treuenbrietzen is situated 32 km northeast of Wittenberg and includes the localities
 city of Treuenbrietzen with its agglomerated suburbs Lüdendorf and Tiefenbrunnen
 Bardenitz with Klausdorf and Pechüle
 Brachwitz
 Dietersdorf
 Feldheim with Schwabeck
 Frohnsdorf
 Lobbese with Pflügkuff and Zeuden
 Lühsdorf
 Marzahna with Schmögelsdorf
 Niebel
 Niebelhorst
 Rietz with Neu-Rietz, Rietz-Ausbau and Rietz-Bucht

History
The town has existed since the Middle Ages and the first written evidence about it is from 1217. From 1348 to 1350 the town remained loyal to the Wittelsbach Louis V, the legitimate Margrave of Brandenburg since 1323, against the revolt of the False Waldemar.  This event was the origin of the town's name, "true" or "faithful" Brietzen.  During the Reformation, Martin Luther came in 1537 to preach in the town, but his way to the church was blocked. He preached instead under a basswood, or lime tree, which is called to this day the Lutherlinde.

During the Industrial Revolution, several textile factories were founded in the town.

After the opening of the Sachsenhausen concentration camp in 1936, a sub-camp was opened in the town, where slave labourers were forced to work in the local weapons plants. Dr. Kroeber & Sohn GmbH (formerly Gehre Dampfmesser GmbH) was a local firm that made steam, gas and fluid gauges, small internal combustion engines, and the Kroeber M4 light aircraft engine. They made BRAMO/BMW Flugwerk aircraft engine parts for the Luftwaffe. Treuenbrietzener Metallwarenfabrik GmbH had two factories that produced cartridges: Werk Sebaldushof ("Werk A") north of the town, and Werk Selterhof ("Werk S") south of the town. It had three more plants in the towns of Roederhof (a hamlet of Belzig), Metgethen, and Salzwedel.

With the approach of the Red Army, on April 23, 1945, the Wehrmacht executed 127 Italian POWs who were interned in the camp. Between April 24 and May 1, 1945, the region was the scene of the Battle of Halbe between the Wehrmacht and the Red Army.

The town was first occupied by the 5th Guards Mechanised Corps on April 21, 1945, but German Wehrmacht and Waffen SS troops managed to return for a short time, finally retreating on April 23. Subsequently, Red Army soldiers rounded up between 30 and 166 civilians and murdered them in a nearby forest.

The town suffered considerable damage during the war, although the historic town centre remained intact. Since 1945, the town's economy has been concentrated on cattle farming. In 2005, it had 8,548 residents. The mayor of Treuenbrietzen is Michael Knape, of the Treuenbrietzener Bürgerverein (Treuenbrietzen Civic Association).

Demography

Famous residents
 Martin Chemnitz (1522–1586), theologian
 Christoph Nichelmann (1717–1762), composer and harpsichordist
 Friedrich Heinrich Himmel (1765–1814), composer
 Johann Tobias Turley (1773–1829), pipe organ builder
 Johann Friedrich Turley (1804–1855), pipe organ builder
 Gottlob Ludwig Rabenhorst (1806–1881), botanist and mycologist
 Hanns Heise (1913–1992), military officer
 Henry Maske (born 1964), boxer
 Eric Fish (born 1969), rock singer

See also
 Red Army atrocities

Notes

External links

 Treuenbrietzen Homepage 
 Treuenbrietzen Heritage Society 

Localities in Potsdam-Mittelmark
Fläming Heath
Soviet World War II crimes
Massacres in Germany
Mass murder in 1945
War crimes of the Wehrmacht
World War II prisoner of war massacres by Nazi Germany